The Amos Gerald House is a historic house at 107 Main Street in Fairfield, Maine.  Built c. 1910 by Maine businessman Amos F. Gerald, the house is notable both for its architecture, which is best described as resembling a medieval castle, and for its association with Gerald, who was a major proponent of electrification in the state, and who built many of the state's (now defunct) trolley systems.  The house was listed on the National Register of Historic Places in 1980.

Description and history
The Gerald House is set on the northwest side of Main Street (United States Route 201) on the fringe of Fairfield's central business district.  It is a two-story building with a prominent centrally-placed three-story round tower that has a crenellated parapet.  The building is fashioned out of concrete blocks that are finished to resemble rusticated stone.  Its roof is flat, and the main roof originally had a parapet similar to that of the tower.  Surrounding the tower on the front is a single-story porch supported by thick columns, also fashioned out of concrete blocks, and sporting a crenellated parapet.  A wood-frame addition extends to the rear of the main block.

See also
National Register of Historic Places listings in Somerset County, Maine

References

Houses on the National Register of Historic Places in Maine
Houses completed in 1910
Houses in Somerset County, Maine
National Register of Historic Places in Somerset County, Maine